The Coppa della Pace is a professional one day cycling race held annually in Italy. It is part of UCI Europe Tour in category 1.2.

Winners

References

External links

Cycle races in Italy
UCI Europe Tour races
Recurring sporting events established in 1971
1971 establishments in Italy
Sport in Emilia-Romagna